Jawaharlal Nehru Government Engineering College, Sundernagar (JNGEC or GEC, Sundernagar or J.N. Govt. Engg. College, Sundernagar) (Devanāgarī: जवाहरलाल नेहरू राजकीय अभियांत्रिकी महाविद्यालय) is a government-funded engineering institute run by the government of Himachal Pradesh, in Sundernagar, Mandi district. It is affiliated to Himachal Pradesh Technical University (HimTU) and is approved by AICTE(2006).

History
Its first batch graduated in June 2010. Under former chief minister Virbhadra Singh the establishment of JNGEC in 2006 was approved. It was initially proposed to start by only offering a mechanical engineering program for session 2006–2007 but later textile engineering was added. The institution was initially affiliated to Himachal Pradesh University, Shimla. The first 05 batches were affiliated to Himachal Pradesh University i.e. 
2010-2014 batch was the last to get degrees from Himachal Pradesh University, Shimla. The construction of the college is going on in stages. 
Textile Engineering at JNGEC  Sundernagar offers the best placements in leading Textile companies across the country.

Campus

The campus is spread over 2.6726 hectare of land. The construction work of administrative ‘A’ block, academic block ‘B’, ‘C’, 'D', and 'E' has been completed. The hostel construction work has to be complete in 2019 but hasn't been completed yet.

Academics

Departments
The college has five Academic Departments.
 Applied Science and Humanities
 Civil Engineering
 Electronics and Communication Engineering
 Mechanical Engineering
 Textile Engineering

The college offers a 4-year B.Tech degree in Mechanical Engineering, Electronics and Communication Engineering, Civil Engineering and Textile Engineering . More branches are proposed to be added in phases.
College is also hosting the classes of Mahatma Gandhi Government Engineering College, Jeori temporarily since August 2015.

Admissions

Undergraduate admissions are made on the marks and ranks obtained by the candidates in JEE MAIN through central counseling and also through CET conducted by the Himachal Pradesh Technical University, Hamirpur. 85% of total seats are reserved for Himachal bona fide candidates and 15% to all-India quota.

The college admits 240 students with 60 students in each department. In addition to that 20% seats in each department are allotted to lateral entry students and 5% over and above the sanctioned intake under the tuition fee waiver scheme.

There are three rounds of subsequent counseling. If the seats still fall vacant after the two rounds, they are filled on the basis of marks obtained in 10+2 or any equivalent examination, according to the 200 marks roster as approved by the Himachal Pradesh government. Lateral entry seats are filled on merit basis and candidates with a diploma in requisite field or an BS degree are eligible for these seats.

Student life

Twask
Twask is the annual cultural fest of JNGEC Sundernagar. It is a three-day long event held towards the start of May. Started in 2012 by bunch of enthusiast JNGECians. It is the most anticipated event of the college, organized at the state level. The festival is a forum for young minds to interact, share and discuss and showcase their new innovative ideas. There are numerous activities for participation and this 3 days fest is loved and enjoyed by students.

Reflexia
Reflexia is the annual college magazine which is published and distributed to the students of Jawaharlal Nehru Government Engineering College. Reflexia holds a part of students skills, talent, and college activities. This interesting version of the magazine is a benchmark in itself and covers every aspect of college life of a JNGECian. This important part of college was established with the hard work and enthusiasm of few volunteering JNGECians and is now continued by some more Volunteers of Literary Club.
The first edition of the magazine was released in the year 2014. The next versions were released in the following years:
2016: Celebrating ten years & the theme being The Major Landscapes of India.
2017: Theme of Battle between Virtues and Vices.
2018: Abstract Theme
2019: Abstract Theme

Clubs and committees
The college has following Clubs and Committees.
NCC
 Cultural Committee
 Sports Committee
 Photography Committee
 Eco Club
 NSS Club
 Technical Clubs
 Literary Club
 Deco Club

References

External links
 JNGEC official website
 Director Technical Education Himachal Pradesh

Engineering colleges in Himachal Pradesh
Educational institutions established in 2006
Monuments and memorials to Jawaharlal Nehru
Education in Mandi district
2006 establishments in Himachal Pradesh